Fatmawati MRT Station, or Fatmawati Indomaret MRT Station for sponsorship reason, is a rapid transit station on the M1 North-South Line of the Jakarta MRT in Jakarta, Indonesia. Located in South Jakarta, it is the penultimate station on the M1 North-South Line, located between Lebak Bulus Grab Station (Terminus) to the west and Cipete Raya (towards Bundaran HI) station to the northeast.

The station is named after Fatmawati Central Public Hospital ( or RSUP Fatmawati) nearby; which in turn is named after Fatmawati, the third wife of the first president of Indonesia Sukarno and the inaugural First Lady of Indonesia.

Location 
The penultimate station on the Jakarta MRT North-South Line (when heading south towards Lebak Bulus Grab), Fatmawati station lies within the South Jakarta, Jakarta. It lies on Jl. R.A. Kartini in Cilandak.

History 
The station opened on 24 March 2019, along with the rest of Phase 1 of the Jakarta MRT.

Station layout

Gallery

References

External links 
 
  Fatmawati Station on the Jakarta MRT website

South Jakarta
Jakarta MRT stations
Railway stations opened in 2019